Bagheli-ye Marama (also Romanized as Bāghelī-ye Mārāmā and Bāghlī Mārāmā; also known as Yāghlī Mārāmā) is a village in Bagheli-ye Marama Rural District in the Central District of Gonbad-e Qabus County, Golestan Province, Iran.  According to the 2006 census, its population was 2,114, in 449 families.

References 

Populated places in Gonbad-e Kavus County